{{Infobox newspaper
| name                 = amNewYorkMetro
| logo                 = AM New York.svg
| image                = 
| caption              = 
| type                 = Free daily newspaper
| format               = 
| owners               = Schneps Media
| founder              = Russel Pergament
| publisher            = Victoria Schneps
| editor               = Robert Pozarycki
| chiefeditor          = 
| assoceditor          = 
| maneditor            = 
| newseditor           = 
| managingeditordesign = 
| campuseditor         = 
| campuschief          = 
| opeditor             = 
| sportseditor         = 
| photoeditor          = 
| staff                = 
| foundation           = October 10, 2003
| political            = 
| language             = English
| ceased publication   = 
| headquarters         = New York City
| circulation          = 
| sister newspapers    = The Villager, Long Island Press, Gay City News, Metro Philadelphia
| ISSN                 = 
| oclc                 = 
| website              = 
}}AM New York Metro is a free daily newspaper that is published in New York City by Schneps Media. According to the company, the average Friday circulation in September 2013 was 335,900. When launched on October 10, 2003, AM New York was the first free daily newspaper in New York City.AM New York Metro is primarily distributed in enclosed newspaper holders ("honor boxes") located on sidewalks at street corners with high pedestrian traffic, and in racks in many major transportation hubs.

HistoryAM New York, along with Newsday, was sold by the Tribune Company to Cablevision in July 2008. AM New York was acquired by Schneps Media from Newsday Media Group in October 2019. and subsequently merged with Metro New York to become AM New York Metro'' in January 2020.

See also
 Free daily newspaper
 List of New York City newspapers and magazines

References

Daily newspapers published in New York City
Pulitzer Prize-winning newspapers
Free daily newspapers
2003 establishments in New York City
New York City local newspapers, in print